The following is a list of Spanish exonyms, Spanish names for places that do not speak Spanish.

It is important to note that some Spanish exonyms are of traditional use, and are therefore preferred over newer exonyms or current or native placenames (for example Pekín over Beijing). In other cases newer names and exonyms are preferred for political or social reasons, even when a place has an older Spanish exonym (for example Bangladesh over Bengala).

Algeria

Andorra

Australia

Austria

Belgium

Bulgaria

China

Cyprus

Czechia

Denmark

Egypt

Estonia

France

Georgia

Germany

Greece

Haiti

India

Israel

Italy

Latvia

Lebanon

Libya

Lithuania

Morocco

Netherlands

New Caledonia

New Zealand

Papua New Guinea

Poland

Portugal

Russia

Serbia

South Africa

Spain

Sweden

Switzerland

Syria

Trinidad and Tobago

Turkey

Ukraine

United Kingdom

United States

See also 
 List of European exonyms

References

Exonym
Lists of exonyms
Exonym
Exonyms